Iago ab Idwal was a King of Gwynedd (r. 950  979) and possibly Powys.

Iago was the son of the earlier King Idwal the Bald but, upon Idwal's death in combat in 942, his uncle Hywel the Good invaded Gwynedd and seized the throne. On Hywel's death in 950, Iago and his brother Idwal (called "Ieuaf") were able to drive out their cousins at the Battle of Carno and reclaim the kingdom. Fighting continued, with the brothers raiding as far south as Dyfed in 952 and their cousins raiding as far north as the Conwy Valley in 954. The southern princes were finally defeated at the Battle of Llanrwst and chased back to Ceredigion.

Having won, the brothers then began to quarrel among themselves. Iago took Ieuaf prisoner in 969 and ruled another decade, with a brief hiatus in 974, before Ieuaf's son Hywel usurped him in 979. There appears to be no surviving record of Iago's fate.

Children
Custennin ab Iago

References

979 deaths
Monarchs of Gwynedd
Monarchs of Powys
House of Aberffraw
10th-century Welsh monarchs
Year of birth unknown
Welsh princes